Maruca amboinalis is a moth in the family Crambidae. It was described by Cajetan von Felder, Rudolf Felder and Alois Friedrich Rogenhofer in 1875. It is found in Indonesia (Ambon Island, Sumatra), Taiwan and Japan.

The larvae feed on Pongamia pinnata.

References

Spilomelinae
Moths described in 1875
Moths of Indonesia
Moths of Japan
Moths of Taiwan